Moose Jaw station may refer to:

Moose Jaw station (Canadian National Railway)
Moose Jaw station (Canadian Pacific Railway)

See also
Moose Jaw